Strong Enough to Break is a documentary film directed and written by Ashley Greyson. It follows Hanson's struggle to record and release their third studio album Underneath, and the creation of their independent record label, 3CG Records. The documentary was shown at college campuses around the United States during its 2005 tour and the 10th Annual Hollywood Film Festival in 2006, where it was nominated for Best Documentary. The Strong Enough to Break DVD/CD was later issued via their official store.

Plot 
Strong Enough to Break follows Grammy-nominated-nominated music group Hanson and their three-year struggle with their record label, Island/Def Jam. In the aftermath of corporate mergers, deregulated radio, and an uncertain future, the band is faced with the challenge of making a new album while dealing with an endless array of obstacles in the music industry.

Cast 
 Isaac Hanson as himself
 Taylor Hanson as himself
 Zac Hanson as himself, the narrator
 Stephan Jenkins as himself
 Carole King as herself
 Danny Kortchmar as himself
 Allen Kovac as himself
 Matthew Sweet as himself
 Greg Wells as himself
 Jeff Fenster as himself
 Christopher Sabec as himself
 Glen Ballard as himself
 Lyor Cohen as himself

Home media release 
 Over 60 minutes of deleted scenes and interviews.
 5 unreleased songs.
 Demos from the recording of "Underneath."
 Never before seen interviews.

Track listing
All lyrics and music are written by Isaac Hanson, Taylor Hanson, and Zac Hanson except where noted.

References 
 Strong Enough To Break on official Hanson website
 Strong Enough to Break Official Website. URL accessed on October 28, 2005.
 The First 8 minutes of the documentary on iFilm.  URL accessed on October 28, 2005.

External links 
 

2006 films
Hanson (band) video albums
Documentary films about the music industry
2000s English-language films